Ruder is a surname. Notable people with the surname include:

 David Sturtevant Ruder (1929–2020), the William W. Gurley Memorial Professor of Law Emeritus at Northwestern University School of Law
 Emil Ruder (1914–1970), Swiss typographer, graphic designer, co-founder of the Basel School of Design
 Gardy Ruder (born 1954), German author and teacher who is now based in Baden-Württemberg
 William Ruder, American public relations executive and co-founder of Ruder Finn with David Finn

See also
 Der Hamburger und Germania Ruder Club, rowing club in Hamburg, Germany
 Ruder Than You, American ska band that was founded in 1989 at Penn State University